Hilltop Manor may refer to:

Hilltop Manor (Bladensburg, Maryland), listed on the National Register of Historic Places (NRHP)
Hilltop Manor (The Cavalier Apartment Building), NRHP-listed in Washington, D.C.

See also
Hilltop (disambiguation)
Hilltop Lodge, a historic motel in Albuquerque, New Mexico